Thomas Hart Benton may refer to:

 Thomas Hart Benton (politician) (1782–1858), American politician in Tennessee and Missouri, father of Jessie Benton Frémont, uncle of the Iowa politician, great-great-uncle of the painter
 Thomas Hart Benton (Doyle), a marble sculpture by Alexander Doyle
 Thomas Hart Benton (Iowa politician) (1815–1879), American politician and Civil War veteran from Iowa
 Thomas Hart Benton (painter) (1889–1975), American populist muralist
 Thomas Hart Benton (film), a 1988 documentary film about the painter

See also
 Thomas Hart (disambiguation)
 Thomas Benton (disambiguation)

Benton, Thomas Hart